The Real Electrifying Eddie Harris is an album by saxophonist Eddie Harris recorded in 1982 and originally released on the Mutt & Jeff label before being reissued on CD on Ubiquity Records in 1999.

Reception

John Vallier of AllMusic said "The album showcases Harris' versatility, improvisational skill, and mastery of tone".

Track listing
All compositions by Eddie Harris except where noted
 "Theme in Search of a Movie" (Charles Stepney) – 7:40
 "Listen Here" – 4:05
 "Essence of Matter" – 5:34
 "Deacceleration" – 6:37
 "For Your Life"  (Bill Henderson) – 9:43
 "Let The Healing Begin" (Larry Gales) – 5:04

Personnel
Eddie Harris – tenor saxophone
Bill Henderson – piano
Larry Gales – bass
Carl Burnett – drums

References

Eddie Harris albums
1982 albums
Ubiquity Records albums